The International Finance Centre, (abbreviated as ifc) is a skyscraper and an integrated commercial development on the waterfront of Hong Kong's Central District.

A prominent landmark on Hong Kong Island, ifc consists of two skyscrapers, the ifc mall, and the 55-storey Four Seasons Hotel Hong Kong. Tower 2 is the second tallest building in Hong Kong at a height of 415 m, behind the International Commerce Centre in West Kowloon, and the 38th-tallest building in the world. It is the fourth-tallest building in the Greater China region and the eighth-tallest office building in the world, based on structural heights; It is of similar height to the former World Trade Center. The Airport Express Hong Kong station is directly beneath it, with subway lines to Hong Kong International Airport.

ifc was constructed and is owned by IFC Development, a consortium of Sun Hung Kai Properties, Henderson Land and Towngas.

In 2003, Financial Times, HSBC, and Cathay Pacific put up an advertisement on the facade that stretched more than 50 storeys, covering an area of 19,000 m2 (200,000 square ft) and a length of 230 m, making it the world's largest advertisement ever put on a skyscraper.

History
Tower 1 is also known as 1IFC and branded in lowercase letters, as "One ifc". Likewise, Tower 2 is also known as 2IFC and branded as "Two ifc".

1IFC opened in December 1998, towards the end of the Asian financial crisis. Tenants included ING Bank, Sumitomo Mitsui Banking Corp, Fidelity International, the Mandatory Provident Fund Schemes Authority and the Financial Times.

2IFC, which was completed at the height of the SARS epidemic, was initially available to rent at HK$25-HK$35 per square foot. In 2007, as the economy has improved, high quality ("Grade A") office space is highly sought after; rents for current leases are $150 per square foot as of March 2007.

The IFC's towers have featured in several Hollywood films, including Lara Croft: Tomb Raider – The Cradle of Life, where Lara Croft leaps off the then-under-construction 2 International Finance Centre, landing on a ship out in the Kowloon Bay, The Dark Knight, where Batman leapt from 2 IFC to 1 IFC, and Godzilla vs Kong, where an action scene then takes place.

One International Finance Centre
One International Finance Centre was opened on 6 July 1998. Completed in 2004, has a similar design and appearance with the “Two IFC”. The building currently accommodates approximately 5,000 people.

Current office tenants include Ballie Gifford, Bank of Singapore, China Development Bank, China Orient Asset Management, CICC, Industrial Bank, Julius Baer, Macquarie, Prudential and Sumitomo Mitsui Banking.

Two International Finance Centre
Two International Finance Centre, completed on 18 October 2003, is attached to the second phase of the ifc mall. This  building, currently Hong Kong's second tallest, is quoted as having 88 storeys and 22 high-ceiling trading floors to qualify as being extremely auspicious in Cantonese culture. It is, however, short of the magic number, because "taboo floors" like 14th and 24th are omitted as being inauspicious – in Cantonese and Mandarin Chinese, "4" is pronounced similarly to "death" .

The highrise is designed to accommodate financial institutions. For example, the Hong Kong Monetary Authority (HKMA) is located at the 55th floor. It is equipped with advanced telecommunications, raised floors for flexible cabling management, and nearly column-free floor plans. The building expects to accommodate up to 15,000 people. It is one of relatively few buildings in the world equipped with double-deck elevators.

The 55th, 56th, and the 77th to 88th floors were bought by the HKMA for HK$3.7 billion in 2001. An exhibition area, currently containing an exhibit of Hong Kong's monetary history, and a library of the Hong Kong Monetary Authority Information Centre occupy the 55th floor, and are open to the public during office hours.

Despite common practice for owners to allow naming buildings after its important tenants, the owners decided not to allow renaming of the building.

Current office tenants include Banco Santander, Baring Private Equity Asia, BGC Partners, Blackstone Group, BNP Paribas, China Universal Asset Management, Citadel, Coatue Management, DST Advisors, E Fund Management, Hillhouse Capital, Hony Capital, Investec Asset Management, Jefferies, Lazard, Lexington Partners, Millennium Management, Nomura, Sidley Austin LLP, Silver Lake, UBS and Warburg Pincus.

Four Seasons Hotel Hong Kong

The Four Seasons Hotel is a luxury hotel that was built near the ifc One and Two. It was completed and opened in October 2005. The 206 m (674 ft), 60-storey oceanfront hotel is the only Four Seasons Hotel in Hong Kong. The hotel has 399 guest suites, and 519 serviced apartments. Amenities include a French restaurant Caprice and spa.

IFC Mall
Anchored by Lane Crawford, PALACE Cinema (part of Broadway Circuit), and C!ty'super, the first official Apple Store was also located in this mall (a 3-storey flagship store in Hong Kong). In May 2018, the first Shake Shack restaurant was opened in the mall.

See also

 List of tallest buildings in Hong Kong
 List of buildings and structures in Hong Kong
 List of tallest buildings
 Shanghai IFC, sister project located in Shanghai
 Salesforce Tower, similar building in San Francisco

References

External links

 
 Elevator Layout
 
 
 

1999 establishments in Hong Kong
Central, Hong Kong
César Pelli buildings
Commercial buildings completed in 1999
Henderson Land Development
Landmarks in Hong Kong
Office buildings completed in 2003
Shopping centres in Hong Kong
Skyscraper office buildings in Hong Kong
Sun Hung Kai Properties
Tourist attractions in Hong Kong